The Flaiano Prizes are a set of Italian international awards recognizing achievements in the fields of creative writing, cinema, theater and radio-television.
Established to honour the Italian author and screenwriter Ennio Flaiano (1910-1972), the prizes have been awarded annually since 1974 at the Teatro Monumentale Gabriele D'Annunzio in Pescara, Flaiano's hometown in Abruzzo, as well as D'Annunzio's.

Since 2001 the cinema section has become a true film festival, consisting of several events and film selections presented in cinemas around the town and open to the general public. The Flaiano Film Festival is one of Italy's International Film Festivals. The Festival lasts one month (between June and July of each year), with the presentation of films in competition and out of competition, allowing the participation of thousands of spectators. The festival is enriched by several smaller festivals each year and is divided into several sections for which prizes are awarded. These include best film, best foreign film, male and female actors, director, photographer, editing, soundtrack, set design and costumes. A special jury prize is awarded, best film of onset and also the premium carriera. The highest award given is the Flaiano gold for the film which is reserved to writers for film, directors, performers Italian and foreign critics.

Award winners

Literary Prize 

1976: Emma Giammattei, Renato Minore
1977: Goffredo Parise
1978: Guido Ceronetti
1979: Mario Praz
1980: Mario Soldati
1981: Roberto Ridolfi
1982: Carlo Betocchi, Pietro Citati
1983: Mimì Zorzi, Gino Bacchetti
1984: Antonio Altomonte, Gesualdo Bufalino
1985: Francesco Burdin, Raffaele La Capria
1986: Piero Chiara, Paolo Barbaro, Mario Rigoni Stern
1987: Gian Luigi Piccioli, Franca Rossi, Gaetano Afeltra
1988: Lorenzo Mondo, Giorgio Soavi
1989: Maria Corti, Fruttero & Lucentini
1990: Luigi Malerba, Claudio Magris
1991: John Banville, Francesca Sanvitale, Antonio Tabucchi,  Antonio  Cibotto
1992: Peter Handke, Giuliana Morandini, José Saramago
1993: Jean-Marie Gustave Le Clézio, Domenico Rea, Luis Sepúlveda
1994: Manuel Vázquez Montalbán, Marie NDiaye, Giuseppe Pontiggia
1995: Daniele Del Giudice, Allan Folsom, Jostein Gaarder
1996: Enzo Bettiza, Paulo Coelho, Tahar Ben Jelloun, Daniel Pennac, Abraham B. Yehoshua, Ken Saro-Wiwa (in his memory)
1997: Tom Clancy, Dacia Maraini, Patrick Robinson
1998: Andrea Camilleri, Daniel Chavarría, Ian McEwan
1999: Vincenzo Consolo, Edwidge Danticat, Max Gallo
2000: Alex Garland, Javier Marías, Daniel Picouly, Fabrizia Ramondino
2001: Michèle Desbordes, Patrick McGrath, Roberto Pazzi
2002: Peter Carey, Silvana Grasso, Per Olov Enquist
2003: John Crowley, Antonio Munoz Molina, Harry Mulish, Elisabetta Rasy, Nikolaj Spasskij
2004: Aziz Chouaki, Paolo Di Stefano, David Grossman
2005: Alberto Bevilacqua, Gianni Celati, Dacia Maraini, Raffaele Nigro, Domenico Starnone
2006: Raffaele La Capria, Amara Lakhous, Enrique Vila-Matas
2007: Hisham Matar
2008: Alberto Arbasino, Ismail Kadaré, Alice Munro
2009: Eraldo Affinati
2010: Silvia Avallone (opera prima)
2011: Margaret Mazzantini, Aurelio Picca, Sandro Veronesi
2012: Maria Paola Colombo (opera prima)
2013: Marco Balzano
2014: Sebastiano Vassalli
2015: Giorgio Patrizi
2016: Jonathan Coe
2018:  Andrea Moro 
2019: Valeria Parrella

Super Flaiano of Literature 

1991: John Banville
1992: José Saramago
1993: Luis Sepúlveda
1994: Giuseppe Pontiggia
1995: Daniele Del Giudice
1996: Abraham B. Yehoshua
1997: Carlo Sgorlon
1998: Andrea Camilleri
1999: Edwidge Danticat
2000: Javier Marías, Fabrizia Ramondino
2001: Roberto Pazzi
2002: Per Olov Enquist
2003: John Crowley
2004: Paolo Di Stefano
2005: Raffaele Nigro
2006: Raffaele La Capria
2008: Alice Munro
2009: Eraldo Affinati
2011: Sandro Veronesi

Poetry Prize 

1986: Maria Luisa Spaziani
1987: Luciano Luisi
1988: Elio Filippo Accrocca
1989: Pietro Cimatti, Vivian Lamarque, Benito Sablone
1990: Edoardo Albinati, Dario Bellezza, Vico Faggi
1991: Renzo Barsacchi, Isabella Scalfaro, Massimo Scrignòli
1992: Marco Guzzi, Luciano Roncalli, Mario Trufelli
1993: Attilio Bertolucci, Cesare Vivaldi,
1994: Piero Bigongiari
1995: Seamus Heaney
1996: Yves Bonnefoy
1997: Miroslav Holub
1998: Lawrence Ferlinghetti
1999: Yang Lian
2000: Derek Walcott
2001: Charles Tomlinson
2002: Adunis

Italian Studies Prize 

2002: Daniela Amsallem, Peter Kuon, Eanna O’Ceallachain, Joanna Ugniewska
2003: Ginette Herry, Mladen Machiedo, Millicent Marcus, Irmgard Scharold
2004: Smaranda Bratu Elian, Marcel Schneider, Tibor Szabo, Minoru Tanokura
2005: Federica Brunori Deigan, Gerard Marino, Rita Marnoto
2006: Larissa G. Stepanova, Ariel Rathaus, Lucia Re e Paul Vangelisti
2007: Teodolinda Barolini, Adel El Siwi, Dagmar Reichardt
2008: Michail Andreev, Laura Benedetti, Angela Barwig e Thomas Stauder
2009: Stefano Fogelberg Rota, Margherita Heyer-Caput, Thian Shigang
2010: Yasuko Matsumoto, Jozsef Pal, Stanislao Pugliese
2011: Marisa Trubiano, Laura Lahdensuu, Jiří Špička
2012: Edward Goldberg, Philip Cooke, Alfred Noe
2013: Konrad Eisenbichler, Joseph Farrell, Augustine Thompson
2014: Geo Vasile, Sania Roič, Barbara Kornacka
2015: Ole Meyer
2016: Fernanda Elisa Bravo Herrera, Armando Maggi, Miriam Oravcov

Special Prize 

1999: Vittorio Emiliani
2001: Imre Kertész
2005: Wole Soyinka
2006: Antonio Skármeta
2010 Premi speciali per il centenario della nascita di Ennio Flaiano: Roberto Saviano, per l'alto valore morale e l'impegno etico della sua opera. Tonino Guerra, poeta e scrittore di cinema
2012: Hussein Mahmoud (Premio speciale di italianistica)
2013 Premi speciali per il 40°: Adonis per la poesia. Jaroslaw Mikolaiewski per la Cultura Italiana nel Mondo. Salvatore Settis

References

External links 
Italian Cultural Institute in Washington

Awards established in 1976
1976 establishments in Italy
Annual events in Italy
Italian film awards
Italian literary awards
Italian television awards
Italian theatre awards